The Marwari is an Indian breed of domestic sheep. It originates in, and is named for, the Marwar region of south-western Rajasthan, in the north-west of India. It is reared in the five principal districts of Marwar – Barmer, Jalore, Jodhpur, Nagaur and Pali – and also in some neighbouring districts of Rajasthan and Gujarat.

Characteristics 

It has white body and a black face. It is a polled breed – both sexes are without horns. The ears are unusually small, and are tubular in shape.

Use 

The Marwari sheep is raised for its wool, which is of coarse or carpet quality.

References 

Sheep breeds originating in India
Animal husbandry in Rajasthan